The Barren Isles (Nosy Barren in Malagasy) are an archipelago located in an area spanning  off the west coast of Madagascar, in the Melaky region. The archipelago consists of 9 main isles or sand banks.

Population
Until November 2013, local customs forbade living on the archipelago; only local fishermen were allowed to shelter or rest for a few days.
Since 2004, Vezo fishermen from south of Toliara in the southwest of Madagascar have migrated to the archipelago in increased numbers. Many now stay on the isles between March and December for up to 10 months of the year, living in makeshift houses made of palms, tarpaulins and pieces of wood. The diverse-eco system now provides shelter for around 4,000 Vezo fishermen

Geography
The Barren Isles consist of the following 9 main isles:
 Nosy Marify
 Nosy Manandra (variously Banc Bayfield)
 Nosy Mboro (variously Nosy Mavony)
 Nosy Maroantally
 Nosy Abohazo (variously Nosy Androtra)
 Nosy Dondosy
 Nosy Mangily
 Nosy Andrano
 Nosy Lava

History
The Barren Isles archipelago was classified as a potential marine-protected area zone by the National Service of Protected Areas (Système des Aires Protégées de Madagascar or SAPM) related to the Ministry of Environment and Forests.

References 

Islands of Madagascar
Melaky
Ramsar sites in Madagascar